UFE can stand for:

United for a Fair Economy
Université française d'Égypte, the French University of Egypt.
Uniform Evaluation, an examination towards Chartered Accountant designation
Uterine fibroid embolization
Ultraman Fighting Evolution
Unuiĝo Franca de Esperanto, until year 2000 that was the name of the main French Esperantist National Organization, Espéranto-France